The 679th Radar Squadron is an inactive United States Air Force unit. It was last assigned to the 20th Air Division, Aerospace Defense Command, stationed at Naval Air Station Jacksonville, Florida. It was inactivated on 31 July 1981.

The unit was a General Surveillance Radar squadron providing for the air defense of the United States.

Lineage
 Activated as 679th Aircraft Control and Warning Squadron
 Activated on 1 March 1951
 Inactivated on 6 February 1952
 Activated on 1 September 1953
 Redesignated 679th Radar Squadron (SAGE), 1 October 1962
 Redesignated 679th Radar Squadron on 1 February 1974
 Inactivated on 31 July 1981

Assignments
 545th Aircraft Control and Warning Group, 1 March 1951 – 6 February 1952
 32d Air Division, 1 September 1953
 35th Air Division, 24 December 1953
 32d Air Division, 15 November 1958
 Montgomery Air Defense Sector, 1 July 1961
 32d Air Division, 1 April 1966
 33d Air Division, 14 November 1969
 20th Air Division, 19 November 1969 – 31 July 1981

Stations
 Great Falls AFB, MT, 1 March 1951 – 6 February 1952
 Dow AFB, ME, 1 September 1953
 Dobbins AFB, GA, 24 December 1953
 NAS Jacksonville, FL, 1 July 1957 – 31 July 1981

References

  Cornett, Lloyd H. and Johnson, Mildred W., A Handbook of Aerospace Defense Organization  1946 - 1980,  Office of History, Aerospace Defense Center, Peterson AFB, CO (1980).
 Winkler, David F. & Webster, Julie L., Searching the Skies, The Legacy of the United States Cold War Defense Radar Program,  US Army Construction Engineering Research Laboratories, Champaign, IL (1997).

External links

Radar squadrons of the United States Air Force
Aerospace Defense Command units